László Földy was a male former Hungarian international table tennis player.

He won six World Table Tennis Championship medals from 1953 to 1961. This consisted of four medals in the team event, a bronze medal in the doubles with Zoltán Berczik and another bronze in the mixed doubles with Éva Kóczián.

He married fellow Hungarian international and his mixed doubles partner Éva Kóczián.

See also
 List of table tennis players
 List of World Table Tennis Championships medalists

References

Hungarian male table tennis players
World Table Tennis Championships medalists